The women's high jump at the 2018 European Athletics Championships took place at the Olympic Stadium on 8 and 10 August.

Records

Schedule

Results

Qualification
Qualification: 1.92 m (Q) or best 12 performances (q)

Final

References

High jumpW
High jump at the European Athletics Championships
Euro